Laura de Carvalho Rizzotto (born 18 July 1994) is a Latvian-Brazilian singer, songwriter, pianist and guitarist. She released her debut studio album Made in Rio in 2011 through Universal Music Brazil, which included the single "Friend in Me". In 2014, she independently released her second studio album Reason to Stay, and independently released the extended play RUBY in 2017.

Rizzotto represented Latvia in the Eurovision Song Contest 2018 in Lisbon, Portugal, with the song "Funny Girl", but placed twelfth in the second semifinal and didn't qualify to the final.

Early life and education
Rizzotto was born on 18 July 1994 in Rio de Janeiro, Brazil. She has an older brother named Lucas Rizzotto, who's a VR/AR creator, and a younger sister named Carolina Rizzotto, who's a content creator, videographer, photographer and producer. Her father is a Brazilian of Latvian descent, with his mother being born in Liepāja and raised in Riga, and her mother is Brazilian with Portuguese roots. Rizzotto is the granddaughter of Herberts Cukurs, Latvian aviator and Nazi collaborator.

Rizzotto and her family moved to the United States in 2005, and settled in Edina, Minnesota for a year. During that time, she learned how to speak English on the go, by going to school and being surrounded by American kids. In 2006 she moved back to Brazil with her family and spent the rest of her childhood in Ipanema, a neighborhood in Rio de Janeiro.

Laura started studying music at only 8 years old, taking classical piano lessons until she was 17. She also studied classical ballet for 8 years in the Escola Estadual de Danças Maria Olenewa, a dance conservatory in Rio. She even competed as a ballet dancer, until she decided to dedicate herself to music full-time. At 14 years old, Laura started taking her first singing lessons.

In 2012, Laura received a scholarship to attend the prestigious Berklee College of Music in Boston. She moved to the United States then to pursue her musical studies and an international career. In 2013, Rizzotto moved to Los Angeles to attend the California Institute of the Arts, graduating with a BFA degree in musical arts. Afterwards, she moved to New York City and received a master's degree in music from Columbia University in 2017.

Rizzotto currently lives in Los Angeles, US.

Career
Rizzotto began her professional music career at 15 years old, when she started doing her first professional shows as a singer/songwriter in her hometown, Rio de Janeiro. Shortly after, she signed her first record deal with Universal Music Brazil. She went on to release her debut studio album Made in Rio in 2011, which featured 15 original tracks (12 in English and 3 Portuguese versions) written by Laura herself and some in partnership with her older brother, Lucas.  The album was produced by Paul Ralphes and the Grammy Award-winning maestro Eumir Deodato.

In 2012, Rizzotto performed as the opening act for Demi Lovato during her A Special Night with Demi Lovato performances in Brazil.  Shortly after, the singer got a scholarship to attend Berklee College of Music in Boston and moved to the United States to pursue an international career.

In 2013, Laura moved to Los Angeles, California, to work on her sophomore album independently. She self-released her second studio album Reason to Stay. in 2014. Less than year later, at only 20 years old, the artist graduated from her BFA in Musical Arts at California Institute of the Arts and moved to NYC to pursue a master's degree in Music and work on her third solo project.

In 2015, Rizzotto began her studies at Columbia University, after being awarded a full scholarship for their Masters program in Music. In 2017, at 22 years old, she graduated with an MA in Music and Music Education from the Ivy League institution. In 2016 to 2017, she worked as the Portuguese language coach for Jennifer Lopez after being hired by Sony Music.

In April 2017, Laura was the moderator of the Music and Culture panel at the Brazil Conference, in Harvard University. The panel featured two Brazilian music icons: Gilberto Gil, Brazil's former minister of culture, and Yamandu Costa, a virtuoso on the acoustic guitar.

In 2018, Rizzotto self-released RUBY, her third solo project and first EP. Laura also composed the soundtrack for "Where Thoughts Go", a multi-award-winning VR experience that was featured in many festivals around the world, including the prestigious Tribeca Film Festival. She also represented Latvia in the Riga Jazz Festival and was invited to perform at the United Nations.

In January 2018, Laura participated and won first place in the Supernova 2018 contest, the National Latvian Selection for the Eurovision Song Contest 2018. She performed her winning song 'Funny Girl' at the Eurovision Song Contest in Lisbon, but failed to qualify for the grand final. She placed 12th in the semi-final with 106 points.

After Eurovision, Laura moved to Los Angeles to work on her 3rd studio album and continue pursuing her career as a songwriter and artist.

In 2019, Laura made history in her partnership with an Augmented Reality capture studio called METASTAGE. International singer/songwriter Laura Rizzotto is the first musician ever to have a 3D virtual performance in partnership with Metastage, a holocapture stage based in Los Angeles, US. Metastage's mission is to make true-to-life immersive content by capturing live performances, and then presenting them in augmented or virtual reality. Users can download the Metastage mobile app now to see Laura's virtual experience with Metastage (Download the app in iOS or Android). Laura Rizzotto is released her single "One More Night" in augmented reality, as well as a virtual performance of her Eurovision Song, "Funny Girl". The project was featured on Forbes magazine.

In 2020, Laura became an official voting member of the Recording Academy, being able to vote for the Grammy Awards, as well as recommend new talents for the academy, submit music for their awards and have access to their private events.

Discography

Studio albums

Extended plays

Singles

References

External links

 

1994 births
Living people
Musicians from Rio de Janeiro (city)
Brazilian people of Latvian descent
Brazilian people of Italian descent
Brazilian people of Portuguese descent
Brazilian women pop singers
Brazilian women singer-songwriters
Brazilian singer-songwriters
Latvian people of Brazilian descent
Latvian people of Portuguese descent
Latvian people of Italian descent
Latvian women singers
Latvian pop singers
Latvian songwriters
Eurovision Song Contest entrants for Latvia
Universal Music Group artists
Brazilian expatriates in the United States
People from Edina, Minnesota
Berklee College of Music alumni
California Institute of the Arts alumni
Columbia University alumni
21st-century Brazilian women singers
21st-century Brazilian singers
Eurovision Song Contest entrants of 2018